BAF Shaheen College Dhaka is a co-education Bangladeshi college (grades KG-XII)  established and controlled by the Bangladesh Air Force.

History 
The school was established on 1 March 1960 as P. A. F. Shaheen School. Originally English-medium,  Bangla-medium was introduced in parallel from 1967. Shaheen High School was renamed BAF Shaheen College Dhaka when it began offering intermediate courses in 1977. Degree pass courses were opened in 1990. Since then the college has been functioning as a degree college. The college has classes from kindergarten to Higher Secondary School Certificate (HSC).

The college is co-educational. There are about 7931 students, 276 teaching staff and 110 non-teaching staff.

Hockey field
BAF Shaheen College hockey field is a hockey field in Dhaka, Bangladesh. It is the ground of BAF Shaheen College Hockey Team. It is the only school hockey ground of Bangladesh containing artificial turf. A number of national level tournaments are held there every year. It was constructed in 2014 with a view to provide better infrastructural facilities to its hockey team and to give opportunity at school level to arrange tournaments of international standard. The construction began in December, 2014.  It was opened in the end of that month making it the first ever artificial hockey turf of school of Bangladesh.

Notable alumni 
 Atiqul Islam, Mayor of North Dhaka.
 Shampa Reza, singer, model and actress
 Kazi Salahuddin, President of Bangladesh Football Federation
 Meher Afroz Shaon, actress,director and playback singer
Sheikh Kamal,the eldest son of Sheikh Mujibur Rahman
Tarique Rahman, Politician, the eldest son of Lieutenant General Ziaur Rahman and Khaleda Zia
M Shaheen Iqbal, NBP, NUP, ndc, afwc, psc, 16th Chief of Naval Staff, Bangladesh
Safa Kabir,  actress, model
Aupee Karim,  actress, model, architect, and dancer
Sheikh Rehana Siddiq, the daughter of Sheikh Mujibur Rahman
Ejajul Islam, Actor and Physician
Hasan Masood, actor, former journalist and military officer

Student clubs
BAF Shaheen College Dhaka Photography Club
BAF Shaheen College Dhaka Science Club
BAF Shaheen College Dhaka Green Thumbs
BAF Shaheen College Dhaka Business Club
BAF Shaheen College Dhaka IT Club
BAF Shaheen College Dhaka Debating Club
BAF Shaheen College Dhaka Quiz Club
BAF Shaheen College Dhaka Mountaineering Club
BAF Shaheen College Dhaka Writer's Club
BAF Shaheen College Dhaka Red Heart club
BAF Shaheen College Dhaka English language and literature club

Gallery

References

External links 
 Official Website of BAF Shaheen College Dhaka

Bangladesh Air Force
Universities and colleges in Dhaka
Schools in Dhaka District
Colleges in Dhaka District
1960 establishments in East Pakistan
Educational institutions established in 1960